Karlskron is a municipality in the district of Neuburg-Schrobenhausen in Bavaria in Germany.

It is located within the Old Bavarian Donaumoos.

References

Neuburg-Schrobenhausen